Rabbi Chaim Kamil (1933–2005) was the Rosh Yeshiva in the Yeshiva of Ofakim, Israel. As a youngster, he learned in Yeshivas Slabodka in Bnei Brak and eventually made his way to Yeshivas Mir in Jerusalem, where he became a student of Rabbi Chaim Shmuelevitz. At the behest of Rabbi Eliezer Yehuda Finkel, then the Rosh Yeshiva of Mir, Chaim Kamil became the Torah study partner of Rabbi Eliyahu Boruch Finkel and Rabbi Nosson Tzvi Finkel, who himself eventually rose to the position of Rosh Yeshiva in Mir and forever regards Rabbi Kamil as his teacher. Eventually, Rabbi Chaim Kamil accepted the role of Rosh Yeshiva in Ofakim and along with Rabbi Shimshon Dovid Pincus, the communal Rabbi there, helped facilitate the growth of the Jewish community of Ofakim. In addition to his duties in his own Yeshiva, Rabbi Kamil also delivered weekly Talmudic lectures in the Yeshiva at Tifrach, Israel.

Many of Rabbi Kamil's Musar-oriented lectures have been published under the name "Imrei Chaim".

Sources
 HaRav Chaim HaKohen Kamil zt"l

1933 births
2005 deaths
Haredi rabbis in Israel